Yite Sar is a 2018 Burmese comedy film, directed by Mite Tee starring Pyay Ti Oo, Khin Hlaing, Soe Myat Thuzar, Moe Di, Bay Lu Wa, Ayeyar and Libby Jennings. The film, produced by Lucky Seven Film Production premiered Myanmar on September 21, 2018.

Cast
Pyay Ti Oo as Ba Kyaw
Khin Hlaing as Fighter
Soe Myat Thuzar as Soe Myat Thuzar
Moe Di as U Tin Shwe 
Bay Lu Wa as Bay Lu Wa
Ayeyar as Ayeyar
Libby Jennings as Libby

References

2018 films
2010s Burmese-language films
Burmese comedy films
Films shot in Myanmar
2018 comedy films